Parkhotel Valkenburg Continental Team is the name of two Netherlands-based cycling teams:
Parkhotel Valkenburg Continental Team (women's team)
Parkhotel Valkenburg Continental Team (men's team)